The Crook Farm is an historic district in Foster Township near Bradford, McKean County, Pennsylvania, United States. It includes the Crook Farmhouse, constructed originally in 1856 and believed to be the oldest such structure in the area.  It also includes the Olmstead Well Site, the first large producer of oil from the Bradford Oil Field.

It was listed on the National Register of Historic Places on March 26, 1976.

See also 
 National Register of Historic Places listings in McKean County, Pennsylvania

References

External links

Crook Farm (Bradford Landmark Society)

Farms on the National Register of Historic Places in Pennsylvania
Houses completed in 1856
Houses in McKean County, Pennsylvania
Historic districts on the National Register of Historic Places in Pennsylvania
National Register of Historic Places in McKean County, Pennsylvania